Anthony Wayne Washington (born February 4, 1958) is a former professional American football cornerback for the Washington Redskins and Pittsburgh Steelers of the National Football League (NFL).  He played college football at Fresno State University and was drafted in the second round of the 1981 NFL Draft.  Washington started for the Redskins in Super Bowl XVIII.

External links
 

1958 births
Living people
American football cornerbacks
Fresno State Bulldogs football players
Players of American football from San Francisco
Pittsburgh Steelers players
Washington Redskins players